Frank Doran is an aikido teacher in the United States and has been chief instructor of Aikido West in Redwood City, California since 1978. He was awarded the rank of 8th dan shihan from the Aikikai in January 2017.

As a U.S. Marine in Korea, Doran served with A Company, 1st Battalion, 5th Marine regiment (A-1-5). He is a former U.S. Marine Corps hand-to-hand combat instructor. His martial arts training began in 1955 when he enrolled in a Judo dojo. Doran began studying aikido in 1959 while stationed at the Marine Recruit Depot in San Diego, California. In 1962, he went to the Aikikai Hombu Dojo in Japan to train under Koichi Tohei.

Doran, along with Robert Nadeau and Patricia Hendricks, founded the California Aikido Association (CAA) in 2002. He served as the Head of Division 2 of the CAA from 2002 - 2016.

External links
California Aikido Association
Aikido West
Aikido Journal interview with Frank Doran.

American aikidoka
Doran, Frank (aikido)
Year of birth missing (living people)